Central Mall is the name of several shopping malls:

Central Mall (Fort Smith, Arkansas)
Central Mall (Salina, Kansas)
Central Mall (Port Arthur, Texas)
Central Mall (Texarkana, Texas)
Central Mall in Singapore, near the Singapore River
 Treasure Island Next Mall, Indore, India, formerly known as Central Mall
Central Plaza (Oklahoma), formerly Central Mall (Lawton, OK)

See also 
Central (Hypermarket), a chain of malls in India
Grand Central Mall in Vienna, West Virginia
Park Central Mall in Phoenix, Arizona